Yasuhiro Tanaka may refer to:

Yasuhiro Tanaka (baseball) (born 1987), Japanese baseball player
Yasuhiro Tanaka (footballer) (born 1984), Japanese footballer
Yasuhiro Tanaka (swimmer), Japanese Paralympic swimmer
Kaidō Yasuhiro (born 1975, birth name Yasuhiro Tanaka), Japanese sumo wrestler